Guy Mankowski  (born 6 January 1983) is an English writer. He is the great grandson of the author and broadcaster Harry Mortimer Batten. He was educated at St John's College, Portsmouth and Ampleforth College. He read Applied Psychology at Durham University and gained a Masters in Psychology at Newcastle University. He then trained as a psychologist at The Royal Hospital in London. Mankowski was the lead singer of the band Alba Nova; in a review of their debut EP Gigwise wrote 'Alba Nova could be an important band of the times'.

Career
His first novel, The Intimates, was a Recommended Title for New Writing North's 2011 Read Regional Campaign. It was described by author Abigail Tarttelin as a 'measured, literary piece of work as hauntingly evocative of its setting and characters as Marilynne Robinson's Pulitzer Prize winner Housekeeping.' Culture Magazine were more critical, and called it 'unusually stylised for contemporary fiction.'

Mankowski's second novel, Letters from Yelena, was described by New Books Magazine as having 'shades of The Red Shoes and The Black Swan.' The novel was given Arts Council funding, allowing Mankowski to be one of a few English people granted access to the Vaganova Academy of Russian Ballet in Saint Petersburg for research purposes. The choreographer Dora Frankel created a dance based on the book. An excerpt of the novel was used as GCSE training material by Osiris Educational. His third novel, How I Left The National Grid, was written as part of his PhD. His academic research applied the theory of Self-fashioning to the punk movement, re-appropriating it as 'self-design'. Whilst researching the book, Mankowski interviewed musicians such as Jehnny Beth from post-punk band Savages. Of the novel, The Huffington Post stated: 'Mankowski captures brilliantly the psychology of fan obsession.' The depiction of Richey Edwards in the novel was considered in a book about Edwards' contribution to the Manic Street Preachers third album The Holy Bible.

The Glasgow Review Of Books described it as a novel 'about the pitfalls of externally defined identity.' Louder Than War said 'this intriguing novel is more about the pop fan's urge to remember.' The novelist Andrew Crumey commented: 'Already recognised as a major rising talent, Mankowski here establishes himself as a significant voice in British fiction.'

Mankowski's fourth novel, An Honest Deceit, was first published in October 2016. It was a New Writing North Read Regional 2018 title, which lead to a tour of English libraries. Writing for HuffPost Daniela Quaglia called it 'a book of outstanding quality.' The book was re-released on Audible, where it was read by Chris Reilly, narrator of books by Ian Rankin and Frankie Boyle.

In 2018 his response to then Health Secretary Jeremy Hunt's tribute to Stephen Hawking received wide news coverage, given Hawking's pending court action against the government. Mankowski wrote, 'He disagreed with you so vehemently he took you to court. If he was truly a hero to you...you wouldn't have argued with him.'

His fifth novel was entitled "Dead Rock Stars", and it concerns the wild summer of a teenage boy struggling to get over the death of his sister, a rising star on the nineties Riot Grrrl scene. Ruth Dugdall described the novel, saying it was, 'A great read. Set against the vibrant backdrop of the 1990s London music scene, "Dead Rock Stars" is a mesmerising study of grief as well as a coming of age novel. I found myself immersed in the narratives of Jeff and Emma and marvelled at how the author captured both voices with such authenticity, particularly that of the self-destructive young woman.' The Scottish novelist Andrew Crumey said the novel 'powerfully voices the concerns of a generation.' Louder Than War (website) called it 'highly enjoyable fiction that uses alternative pop music as [its] guiding light.' Upon its release the novel reached number 2 in some Amazon charts.

Mankowski lectures in Creative Writing at the University of Lincoln. His first non-fiction book was from Zer0 Books (John Hunt Publishing) and entitled 'Albion's Secret History: Snapshots of England's Pop Rebels and Outsiders'. Kate Jackson (singer) from The Long Blondes gave an unreleased photo of her time in the band for the front cover of the book' and was interviewed as part of its release in a promotional series that included Gary Numan and Gazelle Twin. PopMatters wrote 'this book is about celebrating the unsung, and Mankowski has a knack for succinctly articulating what makes each one so special.' Midwest Book Review called it 'an inherently fascinating, iconoclastic, and informative read from cover to cover... "Albion's Secret History" is an original work of impressive research.' 

In 2021 Mankowski interviewed Will Self in an event for Lincoln Book Festival, where they discussed Self's book 'Will' and the nature of memoir.

In October 2022 Mankowski did a live event in conversation with Jane Savidge about her recent Suede (band) memoir ‘Here They Come With Their Makeup On’ and Miki Berenyi of Lush (band) about her memoir ‘Fingers Crossed: How Music Saved Me From Success’ at Lincoln Drill Hall as a part of Lincoln Book Festival.

Mankowski did a 2022 TED (conference) talk in Lincoln, UK on his experience of opening the unseen archive of Kristen Pfaff of Hole (band) for a forthcoming biography he is writing with her brother, Jason Pfaff. The talk is entitled, "Lived Through This': Kristen Pfaff's hidden archive and influence'. 

Mankowski told No Treble magazine, 'I have been working on it since around 2019 when I got in touch with Jason Pfaff. Jason offered to share with me his sister’s unopened archive and collaborate and to share with me her recorded diary tapes which mainly cover her time in Hole (band).' He added, 'The book draws from Pfaff’s archive of essays, letters, and diary recordings. It also draws from a wide-reaching archive of interviews Jason recorded with many people that knew and worked with Pfaff throughout her life...I’ve interviewed many of Pfaff's previous partners, friends, fellow activists, and people who worked with her.'

Publications

Novels
 The Intimates (Legend Press)  March 2011.
 Letters from Yelena (Legend Press)  October 2012.
 How I Left The National Grid (Roundfire)  February 2015.
 An Honest Deceit (Urbane)  October 2016, 2nd Ed., 2018.
 "Dead Rock Stars" (Darkstroke)  September 2020.

Non fiction
 Albion's Secret History (Zer0 Books, John Hunt Publishing)  March 2021.

Speaking engagements
In 2022 Mankowski gave a TEDx talk entitled "Lived Through This: Kristen Pfaff's hidden archive and influence."

Anthologies
 A Body of Strangers in Eight Rooms: Short Story Reinvented (Legend Press) , November 2009.
 The Willows in Ten Journeys (Legend Press) , April 2010.
 Queens of the Guestlist in Radgepacket- Tales From The Inner Cities Volume 4 (Byker Books) , March 2010.
 Roses For Edie in Melodramatic Mayhem and Many Murderous Mishaps (Spectral Visions Press) , October 2019).
 The Ghosts Of Her Dead Husband's Fiction in Uncommonalities Volume 2 (Bratum Books, 2020).

Short stories
The Dagenham Dolls (Structo, 2009). 
The Insiders Party (Litro, 2009).
A Girl Named Grape (The View From Here, 2010).

PhD
 "'How I left the National Grid' : a creative writing PhD on self-design and post punk" (Northumbria University, 2015),

Academic articles
I Can't Seem To Stay A Fixed Ideal: Self-design and self-harm in subcultures in Punk & Post Punk, Intellect Books, Vol. 2.3, February 2014. Pop manifestos and nosebleed art rock: What have post-punk bands achieved? in Punk & Post Punk, Intellect Books, Vol. 3.2, October 2014.
'''Be Pure, Be Vigilant, Behave'. What Did Post Punk Manifestos Aim To Achieve? in Postgraduate Voices in Punk Studies: Your Wisdom, Our Youth, Cambridge Scholars Publishing,  2017.
'A Series of Images / Against You And Me'- Richey Edwards' Portrayal Of The Body in 'Journal For Plague Lovers in Punk & Post Punk, Intellect Books, Vol. 10.1, 2020.

Editing
 Crash, Bank, Wallop: The Story Of The HBOS Whistleblower by Paul Moore (New Wilberforce Media) , November 2015).

References

Living people
1983 births
British psychologists
People educated at Ampleforth College
British male writers
21st-century English novelists
Alumni of Durham University
English male singers
English male novelists
21st-century English male writers
21st-century English singers
21st-century British male singers